"The Very Best Is You" is a song written by Frank Stephens and Larry Shell, and recorded by American country music artist Charly McClain.  It was released in December 1981 as the third single from the album Surround Me with Love.  The song reached #5 on the Billboard  Hot Country Singles & Tracks chart.

Chart performance

References

1982 singles
Charly McClain songs
Epic Records singles
1981 songs
Songs written by Larry Shell